Brigada de Trânsito (BT) was a Portuguese special traffic force, from the Republic National Guard (GNR), which controls the traffic out of the urban areas, they can in some cases act in cities, if they catch violators in those areas.

They are mainly responsible for highways and national roads traffic patrolling.

It was extinct in 2009. The new orgas are "Unidade Nacional de Trânsito" and "Destacamentos de Trânsito dos Comandos Territoriais".

Official link
GNR - Brigada de Trânsito

Law enforcement in Portugal